Pontevedra is a comarca in the Galician Province of Pontevedra, Spain, and centred on the city of Pontevedra. It covers an area of 634.43 sq.km, and the overall population of this local region was 15,625 at the 2011 Census; the latest official estimate (as at the start of 2018) was 124,351.

Municipalities 

The comarca comprises the following eight municipalities:

References

Comarcas of the Province of Pontevedra